"Smily / Biidama" (Smily / ビー玉; Smily / Marble) is Ai Otsuka's eighth single, which was released on 11 May 2005. "Smily" was used in a television commercial for Lion's Ban Powder Spray, while "Biidama" is being used in a commercial for Shokubutsu Monogatari Herb Blend shampoo, also by Lion. Otsuka appears in both commercials. 

The single debuted at number one on the daily Oricon chart. By the end of its first week, it sold 110,512 copies and was number one on the Oricon weekly chart. The current figures show it has sold 310,323 units in total, making it Otsuka's third highest selling single.

Track list

References
avex network inc. (2006), Ai Otsuka Official Web Site

2005 singles
Ai Otsuka songs
Oricon Weekly number-one singles
Songs written by Ai Otsuka
2005 songs
Song recordings produced by Max Matsuura
Avex Trax singles